Patti Cake$ is a 2017 American drama film directed by Geremy Jasper. It was screened in the US Dramatic Competition section of the 2017 Sundance Film Festival. It was released on August 18, 2017, by Fox Searchlight Pictures.

Plot
Patricia Dombrowski wants to join a record label to become a rap superstar. Danny hands her a flyer for an upcoming rap show that he and his friends will perform at.

Patti and Jheri go to the rap show to see Danny and his friends perform. They witness a solo performer, Basterd The Antichrist, who performs a hard rock song but gets booed off the stage.

One day, Patti spots Basterd going through a tunnel known as the Gates of Hell. Patti comes across Basterd's secret spot where he records music and beats and has Jheri come there. As Patti and Jheri are about to get kicked out, she pleads with Basterd to let them record something since they are desperate and want to make music.

Together, they create a demo CD with five original songs. They make copies and start selling a few, even getting Danny to buy one. Patti also meets a radio host named DJ French Tips, whom Patti is a fan of. She gives French Tips her demo CD to listen to.

Patti goes through incidents which blow down her spirits, eventually breaking up with Basterd and Jheri. One day, Patti gets a call from DJ French Tips, calling to tell Patti she liked what she heard from the demo CD. She tells Patti that she submitted her name for a competition for that weekend in Newark called the Rookie Monster. Patti thanks French Tips, and her spirits are suddenly lifted. Patti reconciles with Basterd and Jheri.

Patti, Jheri, and Basterd go to Newark for the show. They learn that Oz, Patti's favorite rap artist, is up on the balcony watching the show. Patti is completely nervous but then gets up the courage to start spitting raps as Barb, her mother, walks in to watch her perform. To her surprise, they used a sampling of one of her old songs, Tough Love, which incorporates Barb's lyrics into the song. The crowd goes wild as they love Patti's raps. Patti even gets Barb to personally sing the chorus. The two embrace as the crowd cheers. Ultimately, Nomad wins the competition, but that doesn't get Patti down.

After the show, Patti meets with Jheri and Basterd and they listen to the radio. They hear DJ French Tips announcing their song from the show which has become the most requested song. The three cheer and embrace each other as their song plays over the radio.

Cast
 Danielle Macdonald as Patti
 Bridget Everett as Barb
 Mamoudou Athie as Basterd 
 Cathy Moriarty as Nana
 McCaul Lombardi as Danny
 Nick Sandow as Ray
 Patrick Brana as Slaz
 Siddharth Dhananjay as Jheri

Release
Patti Cake$ premiered at the Sundance Film Festival on January 23, 2017. The film received distribution offers from Focus Features, Neon, The Orchard and Annapurna Pictures. However, Fox Searchlight Pictures acquired distribution rights to the film for $9.5 million, the second largest deal of the festival behind Amazon Studios' purchase of The Big Sick. It was released on August 18, 2017.

Reception
Patti Cake$ received generally positive reviews from critics. On review aggregator Rotten Tomatoes, the film has an approval rating of 85% based on 172 reviews, with an average rating of 7.20/10. The site's critical consensus reads, "Patti Cake$ hits a number of predictable beats, but adds enough fresh elements -- not least Danielle MacDonald's potentially starmaking turn -- to make its underdog story work." On Metacritic, which assigns a normalized rating, the film has a score of 67 out of 100, based on 37 critics, indicating "generally favorable reviews."

New York Magazine's Vulture.com called the film a "Sundance charmer" and described it as perhaps "the most endearing surprise," of the 2017 Sundance Film Festival. USA Today reported that star of the film Danielle Macdonald was met with a standing ovation when she took the stage after the world premiere at Sundance. Macdonald has been described as the break out star of the film.

The film has been compared to Hustle & Flow and 8 Mile, which both also portray a person struggling to create a career as a rapper.

References

External links
 
 

2017 drama films
2010s English-language films
2010s hip hop films
American drama films
Films produced by Chris Columbus
Films set in New Jersey
Films shot in New Jersey
Fox Searchlight Pictures films
2017 independent films
2010s American films
TSG Entertainment films